Schwietermann Hall is a historic dormitory building located on the campus of Saint Joseph's College in  Marion Township, Jasper County, Indiana.  The International Style building was built in 1962, and is a four-story, "Y"-shaped building composed of reddish-orange brick with concrete trim.  The upper floors of the wings are supported by large, tapered concrete piers.  A two-story connector connects the dormitory building and the main chapel on campus.

It was listed on the National Register of Historic Places in 2016.

References

Saint Joseph's College (Indiana)
University and college buildings on the National Register of Historic Places in Indiana
Residential buildings on the National Register of Historic Places in Indiana
Modernist architecture in Indiana
University and college buildings completed in 1962
Buildings and structures in Jasper County, Indiana
National Register of Historic Places in Jasper County, Indiana